Pra-Loup is a ski resort in France, at Uvernet-Fours in the Alpes-de-Haute-Provence,  from the town of Barcelonnette.

Geography

Ski area
The ski station has two separate base areas, 2 km apart:

 Pra-Loup 1500 - (Les Molanès)

The resort has 53 lifts,  of tracks, and its ski area is linked to that of  through the valley of Agneliers. Pra-Loup hosted the Junior World Championships for alpine skiing in 1999.

Climate
The climate is of the Alpine type.

Transport
By road:

From Paris and the north: via Lyon, Grenoble, Gap and Barcelonnette.
From the south of France: via Aix-en-Provence, on the A51 autoroute as far as Tallard, then in the direction of Barcelonnette.

Toponymy
The name of Pra-Loup consists of Pra, Pro and lovin, derived from a patoise form Pralovin, isolated houses in a clearing and Latin lupinus "pré au loup", loup itself coming from olim le Lau, hamlet. Therefore: Pra-Loup means "meadow grown for hay, or pasture". Pra-Loup residents are called praloupiens and the praloupiennes. According to the Fénie couple, Pra-Loup is the "meadow of loup", an owner's first name.

History

The site of Pra-Loup has been known since the 1st century BC, with the presence of Ligurian shepherds coming from the Mediterranean, who settled here and gave birth to the local tribes. The hamlet took shape in the 12th century, the Chalaisian monks, who came via , built four formerly associated buildings: The church, the school, the priory and the presbytery. From the 14th century to the 17th century, the hamlet grew, with the construction of farms and a hostel, as well as with pastoralism.

Until 1920, the hamlets were sparsely populated, often completely self-sufficient with the mill and oven, though notably lacking drinking water. The inhabitants found an ingenious system to pick up a meagre water source by building a wooden pipeline with hollowed tree trunks, "le bournéous", visible at the Museum of Jausiers Valley. At the end of the 1950s, Pierre Grouès, a medical philanthropist, had the idea to create a skiing resort to develop the attractiveness of the village. The ski resort took shape in the 1960s. Instead of the 3,000 beds that were planned for the ski resort, Honoré Bonnet offered a capacity of 10,000 beds for reasons of profitability. Under the leadership of Michel Lantelme, Mayor of Allos and Louis Lequette, Mayor of Uvernet-Fours, this very large-scale ski area is one of the largest in the Southern Alps.

Since 1981, Pra-Loup has been classified health resort (by decree of 13 January 1981).

Economy
Cut into thin slices, it is eaten both as an entrée and as accompaniment of mountain dishes including raclette, and also accompanies gratins, salads or pizzas. In recent years, the Fumeton has been made in Barcelonnette.

Sport

Tour de France
Pra-Loup was used as the finish of stage 15 in the 1975 Tour de France. The  race from Nice was won by Bernard Thévenet of France, and is regarded in cycling lore as the mountain climb where the career of Eddy Merckx faltered. (See Eddy Merckx - 1975 Tour de France, Pierre Chany). The French magazine Vélo called him "the most accomplished rider that cycling has ever known." The American publication, VeloNews, called him the greatest and most successful cyclist of all time.
The climb is cemented into the history of French cycling by the image of a woman at the roadside, wearing a bikini, waving a sign that said: "Merckx is beaten. The Bastille has fallen."

 Elevation -  
 Departure: Barcelonnette - 
 Vertical rise: 
 Length: 
 Slope: 5.3% of average (maximum 10.1%)

Pra-Loup was also used as stage finishes in the 1980 Tour de France and 2015 Tour de France.

Bibliography

References

External links

  - Pra-Loup ski resort - 
 Ski Map.org - Pra-Loup - 2008
  - Cycling up to Pra Loup: data, profile, map, photos and description

Tourist attractions in Alpes-de-Haute-Provence
Ski areas and resorts in France